Nationalist Coalition–Europe of the Peoples (CN–EP) was a Spanish electoral list in the European Parliament election in 1999 made up from regionalist and peripheral nationalist parties. It was the successor of the 1994 Nationalist Coalition and For the Europe of the Peoples.

Composition

Electoral performance

European Parliament

Defunct political party alliances in Spain
Regionalist parties in Spain